The 2014 Setanta Sports Cup Final was the final match of the 2014 Setanta Sports Cup, an all-Ireland association football competition. The match took place on 10 May 2014 in Tallaght Stadium. Sligo Rovers secured their first ever Setanta Sports Cup title with a 1-0.	
The only goal came when John Russell slipped in Greene whose low cross was finished by Paul O'Conor at the near post.
The match was played in near monsoon conditions.

References

Final
Setanta Sports Cup finals
Setanta Sports Cup Final 2014
Setanta Sports Cup Final 2014
Setanta Sports Cup Final
Setanta Sports Cup Final